Team Colpack–Ballan is an Italian cycling team based in Bergamo, Italy.

The name Colpack is familiar to Italian teams, having previously been a co-sponsor of the De Nardi-Colpack and Team Colpack-Astro squads.

In January 2017 it was announced that Colpack had become the official development squad for the new  team.

Team roster

Major results

2011
Coppa del Grano, Davide Villella
Trofeo Velo Plus, Stefano Locatelli
Trofeo Memorial Tito Squadroni, Andrea Di Corrado
Targa D’Oro Città di Legnano, Davide Orrico
Memorial Angelo Ripamonti, Davide Villella
Gran Premio Vini DOC Valdadige, Andrea Di Corrado
Stage 2 Giro delle Valli Cuneesi nelle Alpi del Mare, Stefano Locatelli
Santo Stefano Lodigiano, Joshua Edmondson
Trofeo Città di Conegliano, Andrea Di Corrado
Circuito Castelnovese, Stefano Perego
Trofeo Raffaele Marcoli, Giacomo Mossali
San Daniele del Friuli, Gianfranco Zilioli
2012
Giro delle Tre Provincie–Limito di Pioltello, Nicola Ruffoni
Milano–Busseto, Nicola Ruffoni 
Memorial Gerry Gasparotto, Edoardo Zardini
Memorial Angelo Fumagalli, Davide Villella
Trofeo Papa' Cervi, Giorgio Bocchiola
Coppa Romano Ballerini–Trofeo Moscolari, Nicola Ruffoni
Stages 4 & 5 Giro della Regione Friuli Venezia Giulia, Davide Villella
GP Industria Commercio Artigianato Botticino, Davide Villella
Stages 2 & 3 Giro Ciclistico Pesche Nettarine di Romagna, Davide Villella
Trofeo Parco del Delta del Po, Nicola Ruffoni
Gran Premio Vini DOC Valdadige, Davide Villella
Trofeo Città di Brescia–Memorial Rino Fiori, Davide Villella
Trofeo Antonietto Rancilio, Nicola Ruffoni
Circuito Ciclistico di Ciriè, Davide Villella
Bassano–Monte Grappa, Gianfranco Zilioli
 Overall Giro delle Valli Cuneesi nelle Alpi del Mare, Edoardo Zardini
Stage 3, Edoardo Zardini
Circuito Salese, Nicola Ruffoni
GP Ciclistico Arcade, Nicola Ruffoni
GP Capodarco, Gianfranco Zilioli 
Trofeo Città di Conegliano, Davide Villella
Circuito Guazzorese, Nicola Ruffoni
Trofeo Mp Filtri, Edoardo Zardini
Medaglia d'Oro Fiera di Sommacampagna, Nicola Ruffoni
2013
Coppa Città di Melzo, Nicola Ruffoni
La Popolarissima, Nicola Ruffoni
Trofeo Antonietto Rancilio, Mattia Marcelli
Classica di Colbuccaro, Davide Orrico
Coppa Caduti Nervianesi, Davide Orrico
Stages 1 & 2 Giro della Regione Friuli Venezia Giulia, Nicola Ruffoni
Medaglia d'Oro Domenico e Anita Colleoni, Davide Villella
Trofeo Lindo e Sano, Nicola Ruffoni
Parma–La Spezia, Gianfranco Zilioli
Giro dei Tre Ponti, Nicola Ruffoni
 National U23 Road Championships, Road Race, Paolo Colonna
Mediterranean Games, Road, Elite, Nicola Ruffoni
Gardone Val Trompia, Gianfranco Zilioli
Giro Valli Aretine, Gianfranco Zilioli
Giro del Casentino, Gianfranco Zilioli
Overall Giro della Valle d'Aosta, Davide Villella
Stages 2 & 4, Davide Villella
Circuito Ciclistico di Ciriè, Gianfranco Zilioli
 Overall Giro delle Valli Cuneesi nelle Alpi del Mare, Gianfranco Zilioli
Stage 2, Gianfranco Zilioli
 National Track Championships (Omnium), Simone Consonni
Corsa delle Stelle Cadenti, Giorgio Bocchiola
Trofeo Marco Rusconi, Davide Villella
Targa Libero Ferrario, Francesco Rosa
Trofeo Rigoberto Lamonica, Paolo Colonna
Piccolo Giro di Lombardia, Davide Villella
Giro del Canavese–Trofeo Sportivi Valperghesi, Francesco Rosa
Copa Internacional de Pista
Team Pursuit, Francesco Lamon
Omnium, Simone Consonni
Madison, Simone Consonni
2014
Piccola Sanremo, Iuri Filosi
Trofeo Mario Zanchi, Davide Martinelli
Coppa Caduti Nervianesi, Damiano Cima
Stages 1 & 2 Bidasoa Itzulia, Iuri Filosi
Pregnana Milanese, Simone Consonni
San Giovanni di Livenza, Davide Martinelli
Stage 1 Giro della Pesca e Nettarina, Luca Pacioni
Ponte San Giovanni Chrono, Davide Martinelli
 Overall Giro della Pesca e Nettarina, Iuri Filosi
Medaglia d'Oro Domenico e Anita Colleoni, Manuel Senni
 National U23 Road Championship, Time Trial, Davide Martinelli
Coppa Giuseppe Romita, Simone Consonni
Roncoleva di Trevenzuola, Simone Consonni
Coppa Quagliotti, Luca Pacioni
Medaglia Oro Nino Ronco, Francesco Rosa
Stages 1 & 2 Giro della Valle d'Aosta, Manuel Senni
Bosco Chiesanuova, Giulio Ciccone
Stage 3 Giro delle Valli Cuneesi nelle Alpi del Mare, Edward Ravasi
Memorial Gigi Pezzoni, Luca Pacioni
Giro del Valdarno, Fausto Masnada
Circuito Viguzzolese, Luca Pacioni
Targa Libero Ferrario, Luca Pacioni
Coppa Collecchio, Damiano Cima
Trofeo Rigoberto Lamonica, Giulio Ciccone
Trofeo Gavardo Tecmor, Oliviero Troia
Piccolo Giro d'Emilia, Simone Consonni
 National Track Championships (Points race), Francesco Lamon
Giro del Canavese–Trofeo Sportivi Valperghesi, Edward Ravasi
Coppa Mobilio Ponsacco–Linea, Simone Consonni
2015
La Torre Fucecchio, Davide Martinelli
Trofeo Auro Boreri, Simone Consonni
Piccola Sanremo, Simone Consonni
Circuito del Porto, Riccardo Minali
Parma-La Spezia, Davide Martinelli
Memorial Denis Zanette e Daniele Del Ben, Francesco Lamon
Fiorenzuola d'Arda (Points race), Simone Consonni
 National U23 Road Championship, Time Trial, Davide Martinelli
Bassano–Monte Grappa, Giulio Ciccone
GP Città di Felino, Simone Consonni
Piccolo Giro di Lombardia, Fausto Masnada
2016
GP Laguna, Filippo Ganna
UCI Track Cycling World Championships (Team pursuit), Filippo Ganna
La Popolarissima, Riccardo Minali
Vicenza–Bionde, Riccardo Minali
 Overall Bidasoa Itzulia, Umberto Orsini
Stage 1, Edward Ravasi
Stage 3, Oliviero Troia
Trofeo Città di San Vendemiano, Simone Consonni
Trofeo Città di Castelfidardo, Riccardo Minali
Paris–Roubaix Espoirs, Filippo Ganna
 National U23 Road Championship, Time Trial, Filippo Ganna
 National U23 Road Championship, Time Trial, Mark Padun
 National U23 Road Championship, Road Race, Simone Consonni
Cronoscalata Gardone Val Trompia–Prati di Caregno, Andrea Garosio
Memorial Angelo Fumagalli, Davide Orrico
Giro del Medio Brenta, Fausto Masnada
 U23 UEC European Track Championships (Individual pursuit), Filippo Ganna
Stage 2 Giro della Valle d'Aosta, Mark Padun
Stage 5 Giro della Valle d'Aosta, Edward Ravasi
Fiorenzuola d'Arda
Individual pursuit, Filippo Ganna
Madison, Attilio Viviani
Gran Premio Industria e Commercio Artigianato Carnaghese, Simone Consonni
GP Ezio del Rosso, Umberto Orsini
 National Track Championships (Points Race), Francesco Lamon
 National Track Championships (Omnium), Simone Consonni
2017
GP Laguna, Andrea Toniatti
Coppa San Geo, Leonardo Bonifazio
GP de Nardi, Leonardo Bonifazio
Piccola Sanremo, Andrea Toniatti
Trofeo Auro Boreri, Pietro Andreoletti
Trofeo Banca Popolare di Vicenza, Mark Padun
Trofeo Edil C, Marco Negrente
Gran Premio della Liberazione, Seid Lizde
Stage 2 Bidasoa Itzulia, Matteo Sobrero
Stage 4 Bidasoa Itzulia, Marco Negrente
Trofeo Alcide Degasperi, Andrea Toniatti
Stage 3 Baby Giro, Mark Padun
Stage 2 Giro della Valle d'Aosta, Giovanni Carboni
Stage 5 Giro della Valle d'Aosta, Alessandro Fedeli
Astico Brenta, Giovanni Carboni
Coppa Collecchio, Federico Sartor
2018
La Torre Fucecchio, Alessandro Covi
Piccola Sanremo, Filippo Rocchetti
 Overall Toscana-Terra di Ciclismo, Andrea Bagioli
Stage 3, Andrea Bagioli
Stages 3 & 4 Bidasoa Itzulia, Alessandro Covi
 Overall Vuelta a Navarra, Francesco Romano
Stage 4, Francesco Romano
Trofeo Città di Brescia, Filippo Rocchetti
 UEC European Track Championships (Team pursuit), Francesco Lamon
Stage 6 Tour de l'Avenir, Alessandro Covi
Astico Brenta, Davide Baldaccini
 National Track Championships (Omnium), Francesco Lamon
 National Track Championships (Madison), Francesco Lamon
Stage 1a Tour de la Nouvelle-Calédonie, Riccardo Lucca
2019
Trofeo Città di San Vendemiano, Andrea Bagioli
Overall Ronde de l'Isard, Andrea Bagioli
Stages 2 & 3, Andrea Bagioli
2021
Trofeo Banca Popolare di Vicenza, Juan Ayuso
Giro del Belvedere, Juan Ayuso
Gran Premio della Liberazione, Michele Gazzoli
Overall Giro di Romagna per Dante Alighieri, Juan Ayuso
Stages 2 & 3, Juan Ayuso
 Overall Giro Ciclistico d'Italia, Juan Ayuso
Stages 2, 5 & 7, Juan Ayuso
Stage 4 (ITT), Filippo Baroncini
Stage 1 Giro della Valle d'Aosta, Alessandro Verre
2022
La Popolarissima, Nicolás David Gómez
Circuito del Porto, Davide Persico

World, Continental & National Champions

2013
 Italy U23 Road Race, Paolo Colonna
 Italy Track (Omnium), Simone Consonni

2014
 Italy U23 Time Trial, Davide Martinelli
 Italy Track (Points race), Francesco Lamon

2015
 Italy U23 Time Trial, Davide Martinelli

2016
 World Track (Team pursuit), Filippo Ganna
 Italy U23 Time Trial, Filippo Ganna
 Ukraine U23 Time Trial, Mark Padun
 Italy U23 Road Race, Simone Consonni
 European U23 Track (Individual pursuit), Filippo Ganna
 Italy Track (Points Race), Francesco Lamon
 Italy Track (Omnium), Simone Consonni

2018
 European U23 Track (Team pursuit), Francesco Lamon
 Italy Track (Omnium), Francesco Lamon
 Italy Track (Madison), Francesco Lamon

Notable riders
 2014–2015
 2012–2013
 2013–2016
 2011–2012
 2014
 2009–2012
 2014–2015
 2016–2017
 2012–2013
 2011–2014
 2010–2013
 2012
 2011–2013

References

External links

UCI Continental Teams (Europe)
Cycling teams based in Italy